Monmouth Mountain, commonly known as Mount Monmouth is one of the principal summits of the Pacific Ranges of the Coast Mountains of southern British Columbia. At , it is the highest summit of the Chilcotin Ranges. It stands just north of the Lillooet Icecap between the heads of Chilko Lake and the Taseko Lakes. West of Chilko Lake's south arm is Mount Good Hope  and, beyond it, the massif surrounding Mount Queen Bess , which is the highest summit east of the Homathko River.

See also
 Mountain peaks of North America

References

External links
 "Mount Monmouth, British Columbia" on Peakbagger

Three-thousanders of British Columbia
Chilcotin Ranges
Lillooet Land District